Pike Lake is an oxbow lake of the South Saskatchewan River in the Canadian province of Saskatchewan. The lake is in the aspen parkland transitional biome between prairie and boreal forest in  Palliser's Triangle.

Most of the southern half of Pine Lake is in Pike Lake Provincial Park and access to the lake is from Highways 60 and 766. An  unincorporated rural residential community by the same name, Pike Lake, is located on the western shore at the northern boundary of Pike Lake Provincial Park. The community includes a school and a recreation centre. Trees around the lake include aspen, ash, and birch.

Pike Lake Water Supply 
Lake water levels are controlled by a 1.5-metre high, 280-metre long spur dike that diverts water from the South Saskatchewan River. The Pike Lake Water Supply, as it is known, is operated by the Saskatchewan Water Security Agency. Originally constructed in 1948, significant upgrades were done in the 1960s with a new pump and supply canal. By the 1990s, the South Saskatchewan River had naturally shifted course and the water levels at Pike Lake had dropped. In 1999, major upgrades were completed to the system to restore water levels. Further upgrades to the pump and canal were undertaken in 2020 at a cost of $2.8 million.

Recreation 
Pike Lake Provincial Park is the main attraction on the lake. The park includes a large campground with 222 sites, an outdoor pool with a waterslide, mini-golf, a 1.5 kilometre nature trail, fishing, and beach access.

At the northern end of the lake is Camp Seeonee, which is a Scouts Canada camp. The camp is made up of two villages with cabins, campgrounds, picnic areas, and outdoor camp kitchens.

Fish species 
The fish species most commonly found in Pike Lake is the northern pike.

See also 
List of lakes of Saskatchewan

References 

Vanscoy No. 345, Saskatchewan
Lakes of Saskatchewan
Oxbow lakes of Canada